Glenwood is a historic plantation estate located at 7040 Philpott Road (United States Route 58) southwest of South Boston, Halifax County, Virginia.  The main house was completed about 1861, and is a distinctive combination of mid-19th century architectural styles.  The main house is a two-story wood-frame structure, with a hip roof.  The cornice has Italianate brackets, and the main entrance is framed by sidelights and a transom window with Gothic tracery.  The interior features an fine Gothic staircase.  Attached to the rear of the house by a hyphen is an earlier 19th-century log house.

The property was listed on the National Register of Historic Places in 2017.

See also
National Register of Historic Places listings in Halifax County, Virginia

References

Houses on the National Register of Historic Places in Virginia
Greek Revival architecture in Virginia
Houses completed in 1861
Houses in Halifax County, Virginia
National Register of Historic Places in Halifax County, Virginia
Historic districts in Virginia
U.S. Route 58